The St. Louis Cardinals 1981 season was the team's 100th season in St. Louis, Missouri and the 90th season in the National League.  1981 was a season of two significant anomalies:  A change in the playoff format, which created the first-ever Divisional Series with a qualification variant that existed only for that season, and the players' strike, which truncated the regular season.  Despite finishing 59-43, good for the best overall record in the National League East, the strike set up the scenario where the Cardinals actually missed the playoffs.  The regular season was split into halves to tally teams' records separately in each half of the season, and because the Cardinals finished in second place in each half, they did not qualify for the 1981 playoffs.  Major League Baseball reverted to the previous playoff format the following season, and the Cardinals qualified for that postseason.

First baseman Keith Hernandez won a Gold Glove this year.

Offseason 
 December 8, 1980: Terry Kennedy, Steve Swisher, Mike Phillips, John Littlefield, John Urrea, Kim Seaman, and Al Olmsted were traded by the Cardinals to the San Diego Padres for Rollie Fingers, Bob Shirley, Gene Tenace and a player to be named later. The Padres completed the deal by sending Bob Geren to the Cardinals on December 10.
 December 9, 1980: Leon Durham, Ken Reitz and a player to be named later were traded by the Cardinals to the Chicago Cubs for Bruce Sutter. The Cardinals completed the trade by sending Tye Waller to the Cubs on December 22.
 December 12, 1980: Ted Simmons, Rollie Fingers and Pete Vuckovich were traded by the Cardinals to the Milwaukee Brewers for Sixto Lezcano, David Green, Lary Sorensen and Dave LaPoint.
 February 16, 1981: The Cardinals traded a player to be named later to the New York Yankees for Rafael Santana. The Cardinals completed the deal by sending George Frazier to the Yankees on June 7.

Regular season

Season standings

Record vs. opponents

Opening Day starters 
 Bob Forsch
 George Hendrick
 Keith Hernandez
 Tom Herr
 Sixto Lezcano
 Ken Oberkfell
 Darrell Porter
 Tony Scott
 Garry Templeton

Notable transactions 
 April 3, 1981: Julio González was signed as a free agent by the Cardinals.
 April 29, 1981: Bill Lyons was signed as a free agent by the Cardinals.
 June 7, 1981: Tony Scott was traded by the Cardinals to the Houston Astros for Joaquín Andújar.
 June 8, 1981: 1981 Major League Baseball draft
Bobby Meacham was drafted by the St. Louis Cardinals in the 1st round (8th pick) of the 1981 amateur draft. 
Tom Nieto was drafted by the St. Louis Cardinals in the 3rd round.
Danny Cox was drafted by the Cardinals in the 13th round.
 September 10, 1981: Joe Edelen and Neil Fiala were traded by the Cardinals to the Cincinnati Reds for Doug Bair.

Roster

Player stats

Batting

Starters by position 
Note: Pos = Position; G = Games played; AB = At bats; H = Hits; Avg. = Batting average; HR = Home runs; RBI = Runs batted in

Other batters 
Note: G = Games played; AB = At bats; H = Hits; Avg. = Batting average; HR = Home runs; RBI = Runs batted in

Pitching

Starting pitchers 
Note: G = Games pitched; IP = Innings pitched; W = Wins; L = Losses; ERA = Earned run average; SO = Strikeouts

Other pitchers 
Note: G = Games pitched; IP = Innings pitched; W = Wins; L = Losses; ERA = Earned run average; SO = Strikeouts

Relief pitchers 
Note: G = Games pitched; W = Wins; L = Losses; SV = Saves; ERA = Earned run average; SO = Strikeouts

Farm system

References

External links
1981 St. Louis Cardinals at Baseball Reference
1981 St. Louis Cardinals at Baseball Almanac

St. Louis Cardinals seasons
Saint Louis Cardinals season
St Louis